Afghanistan has participated only 4 South Asian Games out of 13 governed by South Asia Olympic Council.

Afghanistan started participating from 2004 South Asian Games but pulled out after 2016 South Asian Games.

Detailed Medal Table

External links 

 https://olympic.af/

References 

Nations at the South Asian Games
South Asian Games